Keyhole State Park is a public recreation area surrounding Keyhole Reservoir,  northeast of Moorcroft in Crook County, Wyoming. The state park is managed by the Wyoming Division of State Parks and Historic Sites.

History
Keyhole Reservoir, an impoundment of the Belle Fourche River, was formed by the Keyhole Dam project of the United States Bureau of Reclamation, completed in 1952. The reservoir has a total capacity of 334,200 acre-feet and water surface of 13,700 acres, which provides storage for irrigation, flood control, fish and wildlife conservation, recreation, sediment control, and municipal and industrial water supply. Although located in Wyoming, the reservoir's waters are allocated by compact to go 90 percent to South Dakota and 10 percent to Wyoming.

Activities and amenities
The state park features multiple campgrounds, a concessionaire-operated marina, fishing and other water recreation.

References

External links

Keyhole State Park Wyoming State Parks, Historic Sites & Trails
Keyhole State Park Map Wyoming State Parks, Historic Sites & Trails

Protected areas of Crook County, Wyoming
State parks of Wyoming
Dams in Wyoming
Reservoirs in Wyoming
United States Bureau of Reclamation dams
Dams completed in 1952
Landforms of Crook County, Wyoming